Larry Ronald Kennedy (born November 8, 1949 in Perth-Andover, New Brunswick) is a politician in the province of New Brunswick, Canada.

Kennedy studied at the University of New Brunswick in Fredericton where he earned a Bachelor of Science before going on to earn his Doctor of Medicine degree from Dalhousie University in Halifax, Nova Scotia.

Kennedy served as a village councillor for Perth-Andover and was chairman of the District 31 School Board. A practising physician in his hometown area, he was chief and president of the medical staff at Hotel-Dieu Saint-Joseph, and a director of the New Brunswick Medical Society.

He was elected to the Legislative Assembly of New Brunswick in 1987 and re-elected in 1991, 1995, a 1997 by-election, 1999, 2003 and 2006.  He was currently Dean of the House from 2006 to 2010.

He represented the electoral district of Victoria-Tobique until his defeat in the 2010 election and also practices medicine as a family physician.

References
 Larry Kennedy, M.D. MLA, Victoria-Tobique. Legislative Assembly of New Brunswick. Accessed 2011-02-24.

1949 births
Living people
University of New Brunswick alumni
Dalhousie University alumni
Physicians from New Brunswick
New Brunswick Liberal Association MLAs
New Brunswick municipal councillors
People from Perth-Andover
21st-century Canadian politicians